Being undercover is the practice of disguising one's identity for the purposes of a police investigation or espionage.

Undercover may also refer to:
 Undercover: The True Story of Britain's Secret Police (2012), a non-fiction book by The Guardian journalists Rob Evans and Paul Lewis
 Need for Speed: Undercover, a 2008 entry in the Need for Speed video game series
 Undercover (novel), a 2015 novel by Danielle Steel

Films
 Undercover (1943 film), a 1943 British war film
 Undercover (OSS training film), a 1943 Office of Strategic Services training film
 Undercover (1983 film), a 1983 Australian film
 Under Cover (1987 film), a film directed by John Stockwell
 Under Cover (1916 film)

Television

Series
 Undercover (2013 TV series), a Philippine drama
 Undercover (2015 TV series), a British comedy
 Undercover (2016 TV series), a British miniseries
 Undercover (2019 TV series), a Belgian-Dutch streaming series
 Undercover (Bulgarian TV series), a 2011 crime drama series
 Undercovers (TV series), a 2010 American series that aired on NBC
 Under Cover (1991 TV series), an American series that aired on ABC
 Undercover (2021 TV series), a South Korean series

Episodes
 "Undercover" (Life on Mars), the final episode of the British TV drama Life on Mars
 Undercover (Brooklyn Nine-Nine)
 "Under Covers" (2005), an episode of the TV series NCIS

Music

Groups
 Undercover (band), a Christian rock band from the United States
 Undercover (dance group), a UK dance music act

Albums
 Undercover (The Rolling Stones album), 1983
 Under Cover (Joe Lynn Turner album), 1997
 Undercover (Paul Taylor album), 2000
 Undercover, 2003 album by German band Puhdys
 Undercover (Tying Tiffany album), 2005

 Under Cover, 2005 album by Ozzy Osbourne
 Under Cover – Chapter One, a 2010 album by Tangerine Dream
 Undercover (Ministry album), 2010
 Under Cöver, 2017 album by Motörhead
 Undercover (EP), a 2017 EP by Sheppard

Songs
 "Undercover" (Gemma Hayes song), 2006
 "Undercover", a song by Stephanie Mills from the 1984 album I've Got the Cure
 "Undercover", a song by Selena Gomez from the 2013 album Stars Dance
 "Undercover", a song by Kehlani from SweetSexySavage
 "Undercover", a 2006 song by Pete Yorn for the Spider-Man (2002) film soundtrack
 "Undercover", a bonus track included on the iTunes release of Nelly Furtado's 2006 album, Loose

See also 
 "Undercover of the Night", a 1983 song by the Rolling Stones